The Sibalom River is the longest river in the province of Antique in Panay island Philippines. It is located in Sibalom and San Remigio. Along with its main tributaries the Mao-it River and Tipulu-an River, it forms the  Tipulu-an and Mao-it River Watershed Forest Reserve (now known as Sibalom Natural Park) which was proclaimed a natural park on 23 April 2000.

The Sibalom River has four main tributaries by length: the Tipulu-an River 33 km, Maninila River 31 km, Mao-it River 15.8 km and Cansilayan River 12.5 km. The river's watershed is considered one of the last remaining lowland rainforests on Panay.

Tributaries 

The tributaries of the Sibalom River by length are as follows: 

Tipulu-an River – 33 km (20.5 miles)
Maninila River – 31 km (19.2 miles) 
Mao-it River – 15.8 km (9.8 miles) 
Cansilayan River – 12.5 km (7.7 miles)

References

Rivers of the Philippines
Landforms of Antique (province)